Pittsfield State Forest is an  Massachusetts state forest located in the town of Pittsfield and managed by the Department of Conservation and Recreation.

Activities and amenities
Off-road vehicle usage requires a permit.
Camping: There are 32 sites for tents, pop-up, group, and standard non-electric camping.
The forest also offers non-motorized boating and fishing on Berry Pond and restricted hunting.

References

External links
Pittsfield State Forest Department of Conservation and Recreation
Pittsfield State Forest Trail Map Department of Conservation and Recreation

Massachusetts state forests
Protected areas of Berkshire County, Massachusetts
Campgrounds in Massachusetts